Harry A. Reoux (January 29, 1901 – March 2, 1968) was an American lawyer and politician from New York.

Life
He was born on January 29, 1901, in Warrensburg, Warren County, New York, the son of Louis E. Reoux (died 1938) and Adelia H. (Thomas) Reoux (1873–1958).

Reoux was a member of the New York State Assembly (Warren Co.) in 1931, 1932, 1933, 1934, 1935, 1936, 1937, 1938, 1939–40, 1941–42, 1943–44, 1945–46, 1947–48 and 1949–50. He was Chairman of the Committee on the Judiciary from 1937 to 1950. He was also Chairman of the Special Joint Legislative Committee on Re-Apportionment from 1949 to 1950. He resigned his assembly seat in June 1950, and was appointed in July as Legal Counsel to the latter committee, while State Senator Pliny W. Williamson succeeded Reoux as chairman. Reoux was dismissed from the post in February 1952.

On December 31, 1959, he was fined almost $100,000 for contempt of court.

He died on March 2, 1968, at his home in Warrensburg, New York.

References

1901 births
1968 deaths
Republican Party members of the New York State Assembly
People from Warrensburg, New York
20th-century American politicians